Mariz is a feminine given name. Notable people with the name are as follows:

 Mariz Kemal (born 1950), Russian poet
 Mariz Ricketts, Filipino singer

Stage name
 Mariz Umali, stage name of Marie Grace Michelle Bade Umali-Tima (born 1979), Filipino television news anchor and journalist

Filipino feminine given names